Labirinto Della Masone (The Mason Labyrinth) built by Franco Maria Ricci (1937-2020) after an idea originating from and made to his friend the Argentine writer Jorge Luis Borges was at one time the largest maze in the world. Following Ricci's death, the floral puzzle of approximately 8 hectares in size remains a tourist attraction located in the town of Fontanellato near Parma, Italy. It is adjoined by an arts complex including a museum displaying Maria Ricci's eccentric art collection and typeface holdings especially those of Giambattista Bodoni and another art gallery exhibiting Maria Ricci's work as a graphic designer. The labyrinth itself is made entirely of bamboo.

The site is also a cultural park that has spaces housing Maria Ricci's art collection, the publishing house he began, temporary exhibition halls, conference facilities, concert venues, a gourmet restaurant, and a café.

The museum is part of the Association of Castles of the Duchy of Parma, Piacenza, and Pontremoli.

Though the labyrinth lost the title of the largest in the world in 2018 to the "Yancheng Dafeng Dream Maze" in Yancheng, Jiangsu, PRC, it continues to be the planet's biggest bamboo labyrinth.

References

External links
Official website - 

Mazes
Tourist attractions in Emilia-Romagna
Buildings and structures in Emilia-Romagna
Gardens in Emilia-Romagna